Gelida is a town and municipality in the comarca of Alt Penedès, Barcelona, Catalonia, Spain.

The town is built on a hillside above the Anoia river, the AP-7 motorway, and line 4 of the Barcelona commuter rail network. It is connected to its railway station via a funicular railway.

References

External links
 
 Government data pages 

Municipalities in Alt Penedès